Al Sulayyil or As Sulayyil is a village in Ar Riyad Province, Saudi Arabia. The city is located about 575 km South of Riyadh city proper and 80 km North-East of Wadi ad-Dawasir, another relatively larger city. It has a size of about 25 square kilometers and a population of nearly 26,000. The landscape is that of typical desert and climate is extremely arid. The summer temperature between mid-June to mid-August may reach up to 50 degrees Celsius.

Rainfall is scarce, sometimes no rain in a whole year, however, Sulayyil dwellers have observed some heavy downpours and thunderstorms during the month of March and April in recent years. Winters are mild with few exceptions of colder days, usually in the months of January and February.

Al Sulayyil is in the southern Riyadh region. Along with the nearby city of Wadi ad-Dawasir, these are the main cities of the area which are considered to be one of richest farming areas in the kingdom, although it is very close to the largest continuous sand desert in the world towards the east of the region, named Rub' al Khali.

Sulayyil is mostly inhabited by the people of the Dawasir tribe. The Al Sulayyil ballistic missile base was built in 1987–1988 in the valley 25 km north of the town.

See also 

 List of cities and towns in Saudi Arabia
 Regions of Saudi Arabia

References

Sulayyil